"The Infant Light" is a pop song performed by German singer Jeanette. The song was written by Frank Johnes and Wonderbra and produced by Johnes and Tom Remm for Jeanette's fifth album Merry Christmas (2004). It was released as a single on 6 December 2004 in Germany.

Formats and track listings
These are the formats and track listings of major single releases of "The Infant Light".

CD single
(602498696620; Released  )
"The Infant Light" – 3:07
"The Infant Light" (Christmas lounge version) – 3:52
"The Infant Light" (Karaoke version) – 3:07
"O Come All Ye Faithful (Adeste Fideles)" – 2:53
"The Infant Light" music video

Digital download
(Released )
"The Infant Light" (Single version) – 3:06
"No More Tears" (Radio version) – 3:35

Charts

References

2004 singles
Jeanette Biedermann songs
2004 songs
Universal Music Group singles